The serrano pepper (Capsicum annuum) is a type of chili pepper that originated in the mountainous regions of the Mexican states of Puebla and Hidalgo. The name of the pepper is a reference to the mountains (sierras) of these regions. The pepper is commonly used to make giardiniera.

Serrano plant

Each plant can produce up to 50 pepper berries (not true botanical pods). The fruit can be harvested while they are green or ripe. Unripe serrano peppers are green, but the color varies at maturity; common colors for the ripe fruit are green, red, brown, orange, and yellow. Serrano peppers do better in soils with a pH between 7.0 and 8.5 in warm temperatures above  and have a low tolerance for frost.

Serrano fruit

The Scoville rating of the serrano pepper is 10,000 to 25,000. They are typically eaten raw and have a bright and biting flavor that is notably hotter than the jalapeño pepper.  Serrano peppers are also commonly used in making pico de gallo and salsa, as the chili is particularly fleshy compared to others, making it ideal for such dishes.

It is the second most used chili pepper in Mexican cuisine. The Mexican states of Veracruz, Sinaloa, Nayarit, and Tamaulipas produce about 180,000 tonnes of serranos each year.

See also

 Pickled pepper

References

Capsicum cultivars
Chili peppers
Mexican cuisine